Acrida acuminata is a species of short-horned grasshopper in the family Acrididae. It is found in the Afrotropics.

References

Further reading

External links

 

acuminata